Ljubomir Kaljević (1841, Užice – March 20, 1907, Belgrade) was a Serbian politician and academic who served as the Prime Minister of Serbia.

Biography
Kaljević completed Gymnasium in Belgrade and studied the state sciences in Heidelberg and Paris. Upon his return to Serbia he published from 1867 to 1870 newspaper Serbia, the only opposition newspaper to Prince Mihailo Obrenović around which gathered all the liberal intelligentsia. Kaljević was first elected as a member of parliament in 1871. He began to publish political newspaper Future in 1873. He was Minister of Finance from 25 November 1874 to 20 January 1875.

Kaljević was Prime Minister and Minister of Internal Affairs from 26 September 1875 to 24 April 1876. The government, composed of young liberals and conservatives, prepared the Serbian-Turkish Wars (1876-1878), and issued liberal laws about press and municipalities.

Later he was head of the Ministry of Finance, was one of the founders of the Serbian Progressive Party in 1881, Ambassador in Bucharest from 1881 to 1886, and in Athens from 1886 to 1889, state advisor from 1895 to 1907, Vice President of the Senate in 1901.

As a supporter of the House of Karađorđević, Kaljević became Minister of Foreign Affairs in the cabinet formed after the coup d'etat on 11 June 1903 and the assassination of King Aleksandar Obrenović. He remained in office until 21 September 1903.

Books
Kaljević wrote the book Moje uspomene (My own memories) (1908).

See also
List of prime ministers of Serbia

References

External links
Biography of Ljubomir Kaljević

1841 births
1907 deaths
Politicians from Užice
Serbian Progressive Party (Kingdom of Serbia) politicians
Prime Ministers of Serbia
Finance ministers of Serbia
Foreign ministers of Serbia
Interior ministers of Serbia